Giovanni Dacri, O.F.M. (died 1485) was a Roman Catholic prelate who served as Bishop of Treviso (1478–1485) and Archbishop of Split (1474–1478).

Biography
Giovanni Dacri was ordained a priest in the Order of Friars Minor.
On 19 May 1469, he was appointed as Minister General of Order of Friars Minor.
In 1474, he was appointed during the papacy of Pope Sixtus IV as Archbishop of Split.
On 6 April 1478, he was appointed during the papacy of Pope Sixtus IV as Archbishop (Personal Title) of Treviso.
He served as Bishop of Treviso until his death on 15 February 1485.

References

External links and additional sources
 (for Chronology of Bishops) 
 (for Chronology of Bishops) 
 (for Chronology of Bishops) 
 (for Chronology of Bishops) 

15th-century Italian Roman Catholic bishops
Bishops appointed by Pope Sixtus IV
1485 deaths
Franciscan bishops